Miss Grand Spain (Spanish: Miss Grand España) is a national female beauty pageant in Spain that has been held annually since 2016 to select the country representatives to compete in Miss Grand International pageant. Its inaugural edition was held in Seville with 24 provinces and autonomous communities participating; in which Adriana Sánchez Rivas of Málaga won the main title. The pageant has been owned by Vicente Gonzalez since the establishment.

The reigning Miss Grand Spain is Alba Dunkerbeck of Costa Canaria who was crowned on 16 May 2021 at Hotel Orquídea, in Bahía Feliz. Dunkerbeck represented the country later at the  pageant in Bangkok, Thailand, on 4 December and finished as the Top 10 finalists.

Background

History
Miss Grand Spain was held for the first time in 2016 after Vicente Gonzalez took over the franchise from the former owner, Marcel Arnalot Salazar, in 2015. Few provincial pageants were held to select their representatives for the inaugural edition such as Miss Grand Sevilla, Miss Grand Huelva, and Miss Grand Ciudad Real. However, the number of its preliminary contest was significantly increased to 24 in the 2021 edition. In some provinces, for instance, Seville, Huelva, and Cádiz, local pageants are also held to determine delegates for the province competition,  in which winners hold the title "Miss Grand (Province)" for the year of their reign. Some runners-up of the provincial pageants might be appointed to represent the neighboring provinces in case the directors of such provinces were lacking.

The pageant was canceled for the first time in 2020 due to the COVID-19 pandemic, originally scheduled to be held at the Fair Pavilion in the city of Daimiel in Ciudad Real Province on 3 October, with 31 provincial representatives. Nonetheless, all such candidates instead gained the right to participate in Las Palmas for the succeeding edition, Miss Grand Spain 2021. The event also featured the presence of Dori Rodríguez from Navarre, the first openly transgender contestant to compete for the Miss Grand Spain title.

Since 2018, the pageant, including its regional organs, has collaborated with many non-governmental organizations (NGOs) to raise funds available and provide necessities for the needed people, such as; the Pequeño Valiente Foundation, which is dedicated to providing the necessary support to children and families affected by childhood cancers, as well as the Mechones Solidarios, the Málaga-based NGO that produce and donate natural hair wigs to chemotherapy-induced and universal alopecia patients.

Date and Location
The following list is the edition detail of the Miss Grand Spain contest, since its inception in 2016.

Main pageant
The pre-pageant of Miss Grand Spain is usually commenced a week before the grand final contest, consisting of the swimsuit competition, personal interview, national costume round, and the preliminary competition. In the preliminary round, held 2–3 days before the grand final, all contestants will compete in swimwear, cocktail dress, and evening gowns in front of a panel of preliminary judges. Each round of the preliminary competition together with the Swimsuit competition will determine the winner of the Best Evening Gown, Best cocktail dress, as well as the Best in Swimsuit awards,  all such awards will be announced later in the grand final round. Moreover, the scores from all pre-pageant portions, also determine the quarterfinalists during the grand final telecast of the pageant.

Titleholders

Winner gallery

National finalists
The following list is the national finalists of the Miss Grand Spain pageant, as well as the competition results.

Color keys
 Declared as the winner
 Ended as a runner-up (Top 5)
 Ended as a semifinalist (Top 9,10,11)
 Ended as a quaterfinalist (Top 13,14,15)
 Did not participate
 Withdraw during the competition

See also 

Miss Spain
Míster España
Miss Earth Spain
Miss World Málaga

References

Spain
Recurring events established in 2016
Spanish awards

Spain